This article lists people who have been featured on United States postage stamps, listed by their name, the year they were first featured on a stamp, and a short description of their notability. Since the United States Post Office issued its first stamp in 1847, over 4,000 stamps have been issued and over 800 people featured. Many of these people (especially the earlier presidents) have been featured on multiple stamps.  Most every one was deceased at the time their face appeared on a stamp.

For the purpose of this list, "featured" may mean:
 The likeness of a person,
 The name of a person, or
 People who have neither their likeness nor name on a stamp, but are documented by the United States Postal Service as being the subject of a stamp (see Reference).

A 

Edwin Austin Abbey (2001) Illustrator
Edward R. Abrams (2008) Film actor
Roy Acuff (2003) Country singer, musician, and songwriter
Ansel Adams (2002) Photographer
Jane Addams (1940) Social Worker
John Adams (1938) 2nd president

John Quincy Adams (1938) 6th president
Samuel Adams (1976) Declaration of Independence signer
Alvin Ailey (2004) Choreographer
Louisa May Alcott (1940) Author
Buzz Aldrin (1994), (2019) Astronaut, engineer
Horatio Alger, Jr. (1982) Author
Dante Alighieri (1965) Poet

Gracie Allen (2009) Comedian
Richard Allen (2016) African-American bishop, founder of AME Church
Steve Allen (2009) Comedian
Fran Allison (2009) Actress
C. Alfred "Chief" Anderson (2014) Aviator
Marian Anderson (2005) Contralto
Susan B. Anthony (1936) Suffragist, feminist, and abolitionist

Johnny Appleseed (1966) Conservationist
Harold Arlen (1996) Composer

Edwin Armstrong (1983) FM radio inventor
Louis Armstrong (1995) Jazz singer, musician, and songwriter
Neil Armstrong (1969), (2019) Astronaut, engineer
Henry Harley "Hap" Arnold (1988) Air Force General
Ruth Asawa (2020) Sculptor, artist
Arthur Ashe (2005) Tennis player

John James Audubon (1940) Naturalist, painter

Gene Autry (2010) Actor

B 

Ella Baker (2009) Civil rights leader
Josephine Baker (2008) Singer
George Balanchine (2004) Choreographer
Vasco Núñez de Balboa (1913) Explorer
Abraham Baldwin (1985) Statesman
James Baldwin (2004) Author
Lucille Ball (2001) Actress
Benjamin Banneker (1980) Surveyor, astronomer, mathematician and almanac author
Francis Barbé-Marbois (1953) Louisiana Purchase negotiator
Samuel Barber (1997) Composer
John Bardeen (2008) Physicist

John Bartram (1999) Botanist
William Bartram (1999) Botanist
John Basilone (2005) Marine, Medal of Honor recipient
Daisy Bates (2009) Civil rights leader
James Beard (2014) Chef, TV personality, cookbook author
Romare Bearden (2011) Artist
The Beatles (1999) Rock music band
Norman Bel Geddes (2011) Industrial designer

Stephen Vincent Benét (1998) Author
Milton Berle (2009) Comedian
Irving Berlin (2002) Composer

Leonard Bernstein (2001) Conductor, composer
Albert Bierstadt (1998) Painter
Hiram Bingham IV (2006) Diplomat
George Caleb Bingham (1998) Painter
Elizabeth Bishop (2012) Poet
Elizabeth Blackwell (1974) 1st U.S. female physician

Nellie Bly (2002) Journalist
Humphrey Bogart (1997) Actor
Charles E. Bohlen (2006) Diplomat
Simón Bolívar (1958) South American revolutionary
Sandro Botticelli (1981) Painter
William Boyd (2009) Actor
Elizabeth Boyer (2008) Actress
Omar N. Bradley (2000) World War II Army General
Louis Brandeis (2009) Supreme Court justice
Mary Breckinridge (1998) Frontier Nursing Services founder
William Brennan Jr. (2009) Supreme Court justice
Joseph Brodsky (2012) Poet
Gwendolyn Brooks (2012) Poet
Paul "Bear" Bryant (1997) Football coach
Julia de Burgos (2010) Poet
Arleigh Albert Burke (2010) Admiral

George Burns (2009) Comedian
Raymond Burr (2009) Actor
Edgar Rice Burroughs (2012) Author

C 

Antoine de la Mothe Cadillac (1951) Explorer
James Cagney (1999) Actor
Alexander Calder (1998) Sculptor
Melvin Calvin (2011) Chemist
Walter Camp (2003) Football coach
Roy Campanella (2006) Baseball player
Frank Capra (2012) Motion picture director
Hattie Caraway (2001) 1st female senator

Andrew Carnegie (1960) Entrepreneur and philanthropist
Art Carney (2009) Actor
Charles Carroll of Carrollton (1976) Declaration of Independence signer

George Washington Carver (1948) Botanist
Johnny Cash (2013) Singer

Mary Cassatt (1966) Painter

George Catlin (1998) Painter
Wilt Chamberlain (2014) Basketball player
Carrie Chapman Catt (1948) Suffragist
Ignacio Chacón (2006) Painter
Samuel de Champlain (2006) Explorer
Lon Chaney Jr. (1997) Actor
Charlie Chaplin (1994) Actor
Dave Chapman (2011) Industrial designer
Ray Charles (2013) Musician
Samuel Chase (1976) Declaration of Independence signer
Cesar Chavez (2003) Labor rights leader
Joyce Chen (2014) Chef, TV personality, cookbook author
Claire Lee Chennault (1990) World War II General
Charles W. Chesnutt (2008) Writer
Julia Child (2014) Chef, TV personality, cookbook author
Shirley Chisholm (2014) Congresswoman

Winston Churchill (1965) British Prime Minister
William Clark (1954) Explorer

Henry Clay (1870, 1902) Statesman
Roberto Clemente (1984 & 2000) Baseball player

Grover Cleveland (1923) 22nd & 24th president
J. R. Clifford (2009) Attorney
George Clymer (1976) Declaration of Independence signer
David Cobb (1976) Congressional Representative, 3rd U.S. Congress
Ty Cobb (2000) Baseball player
Alvin Langdon Coburn (2002) Photographer
Jacqueline Cochran (1996) Aviator
Mickey Cochrane (2000) Baseball player
Victoria Codona (2014) Circus performer
Eddie Collins (2000) Baseball player
James Cook (1978) Explorer

Calvin Coolidge (1938) 30th president
Anna Julia Cooper (2009) Civil rights leader
Gary Cooper (1990, 2009) Actor

Nicolaus Copernicus (1973) Astronomer
Gerty Cori (2008) Biochemist
Dean Cornwell (2001) Illustrator
Francisco Vásquez de Coronado (1940) Explorer
Lorenzo Costa (2001) Painter
Davy Crockett (1967) Alamo defender

Celia Cruz  (2011) Musician
E. E. Cummings (2012) Poet
Imogen Cunningham (2002) Photographer
Manasseh Cutler (1937) Northwest Territory pioneer

D 

Daniel Daly (2005) Marine; Medal of Honor recipient

Allison Davis (1994) Educator, anthropologist
Benjamin Oliver Davis, Sr. (1997) Army General
Bette Davis (2008) Actress
Jefferson Davis (1970) Confederate president
Miles Davis (2012) Jazz musician
Stuart Davis (2013) Modern artist
Julia de Burgos (2010) Puerto Rican writer and poet
Agnes de Mille (2004) Choreographer
Dizzy Dean (2000) Baseball player
Willem de Kooning (2010) Abstract expressionist artist
Andrea della Robbia (1978) Sculptor

Jack Dempsey (1998) Boxer
Charles Demuth (2013) Modern artist
Donald Deskey (2011) Industrial designer

George Dewey (1936) Navy Admiral
John Dewey (1968) Educator
Emily Dickinson (1971) Poet
John Dickinson (1976) American lawyer and Governor of Delaware and Pennsylvania
William Dickson (1996) Motion picture camera inventor
Joe DiMaggio (2012) Baseball player
Walt Disney (1968) Motion picture producer, animator
Larry Doby (2012) Baseball player
Jimmy Dorsey (1996) Jazz musician and bandleader
Tommy Dorsey (1996) Jazz musician and bandleader
Aaron Douglas (2013) Modern artist
Stephen A. Douglas (1958) Politician
Frederick Douglass (1967) Abolitionist
Arthur Dove (2013) Modern artist
Henry Dreyfuss (2011) Industrial designer
W. E. B. Du Bois (1992) Civil Rights advocate
Marcel Duchamp (2013) Modern Artist
John Foster Dulles (1960) Secretary of State
Paul Laurence Dunbar (1975) Poet

Isadora Duncan (2012) Dancer
Katherine Dunham (2012) Choreographer
Harvey Dunn (2001) Illustratorr

E 

Thomas Eakins (1967) Painter, sculptor

Charles and Ray Eames (2008) Industrial design, furniture design
Amelia Earhart (1963) Aviator

George Eastman (1954) Roll film inventor
Thomas Alva Edison (1947) Inventor
Albert Einstein (1966) Physicist

Billy Eisengrein (2002) Ground Zero firefighter
Dwight D. Eisenhower (1969) 34th president

Edward Kennedy "Duke" Ellington (1986) Jazz musician and composer
Ralph Ellison (2014) Author and literary critic

Leif Ericson (1968) Explorer
Jaime Escalante (2016) Educator
Walker Evans (2002) Photographer
Medgar Evers (2009) Civil rights leader

F 

Robert Fawcett (2001) Illustrator
Edna Ferber (2002) Author
Perry Ferguson (2003) Motion picture art director

Enrico Fermi (2001) Physicist
José Ferrer (2012) Actor
Richard Feynman (2005) Physicist
Arthur Fiedler (1997) Conductor
Millard Fillmore (1938) 13th president

Ella Fitzgerald (2007) Jazz singer
James Montgomery Flagg (2001) Illustrator

Father Edward J. Flanagan (1986) Orphan advocate
Henry Fonda (2005) Actor
Lynn Fontanne (1999) Actress
Gerald Ford (2007) President of the United States
John Ford (2012) Motion picture director
Bob Fosse (2012) Choreographer
Rube Foster (2010) Baseball player
George L. Fox, Chaplain (1st Lt.), U.S. Army (1948)
Jimmie Foxx (2000) Baseball player
Felix Frankfurter (2009) Supreme Court justice
Benjamin Franklin (1847) 1st Postmaster, statesman, scientist

Elizabeth Freake (1998) Subject of portrait by Freake Limner
Mary Freake (1998) Subject of portrait by Freake Limner
Arthur Burdett Frost (2001) Illustrator
Buckminster Fuller (2004) Inventor

Robert Fulton (1909) Steamboat inventor

G 

Ernest J. Gaines (2023) Author
Albert Gallatin (1967) Secretary of the Treasury
Thomas H. Gallaudet (1983) Educator
Mohandas Gandhi (1961) Indian patriot
Greta Garbo (2005) Actress
Carlos Gardel (2011) Singer

Giuseppe Garibaldi (1960) Italian patriot
Judy Garland (1990) Actress
Lou Gehrig (1989) Baseball player
Theodor Seuss Geisel (1999) Author & illustrator
Martha Gellhorn (2008) Journalist
Geronimo (1994) Apache leader
Elbridge Gerry (1976) Declaration of Independence signer

George Gershwin (1973) Composer and musician
Ira Gershwin (1999) Lyricist
Amadeo P. Giannini (1973) Bank of America founder
Josiah Willard Gibbs (2005) Thermodynamicist
Josh Gibson (2000) Baseball player
Althea Gibson  (2013) Tennis player
Jackie Gleason (2009) Comedian

Robert H. Goddard (1964) Rocket scientist
Maria Goeppert-Mayer (2011) Physicist
Samuel Gompers (1950) Labor union leader

Alexander D. Goode, Ph.D. (1948) Chaplain (1st Lt.), U.S. Army (1948)
Arshile Gorky (2010) Abstract expressionist artist

Jan Gossaert (2002) Painter
Adolph Gottlieb (2010) Abstract expressionist artist
Louis Moreau Gottschalk (1997) Composer
Martha Graham (2004) Choreographer
Red Grange (2003) Football player
Cary Grant (2002) Actor
François Joseph Paul Grasse (1931) Revolutionary War Admiral
Asa Gray (2011) Botanist

Hank Greenberg (2006) Baseball player
Ferde Grofé (1997) Composer
Lefty Grove (2000) Baseball player

H 

Philip Habib (2006) Diplomat
George Halas (1997) Football coach

Nathan Hale (1925) Revolutionary War officer
Fannie Lou Hamer (2009) Civil rights leader

William Christopher Handy (1969) Blues musician and composer
Yip Harburg (2005) Lyricist

William Harnett (1969) Painter

Patricia Roberts Harris (2000) Presidential Cabinet member, ambassador

Moss Hart (2004) Playwright
William S. Hart (2010) Actor
Marsden Hartley (2013) Modern artist
Josiah Johnson Hawes (2002) Photographer
Robert Hayden (2012) Poet
Helen Hayes (2011) Actress

Mary Ludwig Hays (Molly Pitcher) (1928) Battlefield volunteer
Martin Johnson Heade (2004) Painter

John Held, Jr. (2001) Illustrator

Jimi Hendrix (2014) Musician
O. Henry (2012) Author
Jim Henson (2005) Muppets creator

Audrey Hepburn (2003) Actress
Katharine Hepburn (2010) Actress
John Hersey (2008) Journalist
Charlton Heston (2014) Actor
Joseph Hewes (1976) Declaration of Independence signer
Marguerite Higgins (2002) Journalist
Lewis Hine (2002) Photographer
Gregory Hines (2019) Dancer, actor, singer, and choreographer
John L. Hines (2000) World War I General
Alfred Hitchcock (1998) Motion picture director
Oveta Culp Hobby (2011) Women's Army Corps officer
Hans Hofmann (2010) Abstract expressionist painter
Winslow Homer (1962) Painter
Herbert Hoover (1965) 31st president
Bob Hope (2009) Comedian
Edward Hopper (1970) Painter
Rogers Hornsby (2000) Baseball player
Harry Houdini (2002) Magician
Charles Hamilton Houston (2009) Civil rights leader
Edwin Hubble (2000) Astronomer

Langston Hughes (2002) Author

Cordell Hull (1963) Secretary of State
Ruby Hurley (2009) Civil rights leader
Zora Neale Hurston (2003) Author
John Huston (2012) Motion picture director

I 

Washington Irving (1940) Author
Charles Ives (1997) Composer

J 
Andrew Jackson (1861) 7th president

Mahalia Jackson (1998) Gospel singer
Thomas "Stonewall" Jackson (1937) Confederate Army General

Henry James (2016) Writer
Thomas Jefferson (1861) 3rd president

Jesus (1966) Christianity founder

George Johnson (2002) Ground Zero firefighter
John H. Johnson (2012) Publisher
Joshua Johnson (1998) Painter
Lady Bird Johnson (2012) First Lady
Lyndon B. Johnson (1973) 36th president
Walter Johnson (2000) Baseball player
William Johnson (artist) (2012) Artist
John Paul Jones (1936) Revolutionary War Naval Captain
Bobby Jones (1981) Golfer
Barbara Jordan (2011) Congresswoman
Louis Jordan (2008) Musician/singer
Chief Joseph (1968) Nez Perce warrior

K 
Duke Kahanamoku (2002) Surfer, swimmer
Frida Kahlo (2001) Painter

Kamehameha I of Hawaii (1937) Hawaiian King
Boris Karloff (1997) Actor
Gertrude Käsebier (2002) Photographer

Stephen Watts Kearny (1946) Mexican American War officer
John Fitzgerald Kennedy (1964) 35th president
Rockwell Kent (2001) Illustrator
André Kertész (2002) Hungarian photographer
Martin Luther King, Jr. (1979) Civil Rights advocate
Lajos Kossuth (1958) Hungarian patriot

L 

Marquis de Lafayette (1952) Revolutionary War General

Dorothea Lange (2002) Photographer
Mary Lasker (2009) Philanthropist

Huddie Ledbetter (1998) Blues singer, musician, and songwriter
Jason Lee (1948) Oregon Territory missionary

Richard Henry Lee (1976) Declaration of Independence signer
Lillian Leitzel (2014) Circus gymnast
John A. Lejeune (2005) Marine Corps Commandant
Denise Levertov (2012) Poet
Edna Lewis (2014) Chef, cookbook author

Meriwether Lewis (1954) Explorer
Joseph Christian Leyendecker (2001) Illustrator
José Limón (2012) Choreographer
Abraham Lincoln (1866, 1954) 16th president
Tad Lincoln (1984) son of Abraham Lincoln
Charles Lindbergh (1927) Aviator
Raymond Loewy (2011) Industrial designer
Vince Lombardi (1997) Football coach
Jack London (1986) Author
Crawford W. Long (1940) Physician
Hillary Long (2014) Circus performer
Henry Wadsworth Longfellow (1940) Poet
Henry R. Luce (1998) Publisher
Bela Lugosi (1997) Actor
Bernardino Luini (2007) Painter
Alfred Lunt (1999) Actor

M 

Clara Maass (1976) Nurse
James Madison (1894, 1938) 4th president
Ramon Magsaysay (1957) Philippine president
Henry Mancini (2004) Composer

C.G.E. Mannerheim (1960) Finnish president
Mickey Mantle (2006) Baseball player
Rocky Marciano (1999) Boxer
John Marin (2013) Modern artist
Roger Maris (1999) Baseball player
Jacques Marquette (1898, 1968) Explorer
George Catlett Marshall (1965) Secretary of State, Army general

Thurgood Marshall (2003) Supreme Court Justice
Roberta Martin (1998) Gospel singer, musician, and songwriter

Mary (The Madonna) (1966) Central figure in Christianity
Groucho Marx (2009) Comedian
Tomáš Masaryk (1960) President of Czechoslovakia
Edgar Lee Masters (1970) Poet
Christy Mathewson (2000) Baseball player
Bill Mauldin (2010) Cartoonist

Ephraim McDowell (1959) Surgeon
Barbara McClintock (2005) Geneticist
John McCloy (2010) Navy sailor
John McCormack (1984) Tenor
Cyrus Hall McCormick (1940) Mechanical reaper inventor
Hattie McDaniel (2006) Actress

Brien McMahon (1962) Atomic Energy Act author
Neysa McMein (2001) Illustrator

Clyde McPhatter (1993) R&B singer
Dan McWilliams (2002) Ground Zero firefighter
Margaret Mead (1998) Anthropologist
George Meany (1994) Labor union leader
Herman Melville (1984) Author
Lydia Mendoza (2013) Guitarist and singer
Oscar Micheaux (2010) Motion picture director
James Michener (2008) Writer
Arthur Middleton (1976) Declaration of Independence signer
Harvey Milk (2014) Politician
Edna St. Vincent Millay (1981) Poet
Don Miller (1998) Football player
Doris Miller (2010) Navy veteran
Carmen Miranda (2011) Singer
Billy Mitchell (1999) Air Force general
Joan Mitchell (2010) Abstract expressionist artist
Margaret Mitchell (1986) Author
Tom Mix (2010) Actor
Lorenzo Monaco (2004) Painter

Clayton Moore (2009) Actor
Justin S. Morrill (1999) Senator
Lewis Morris (1976) Declaration of Independence signer
Robert Morris (financier) (1952) Declaration of Independence signatory
Samuel F. B. Morse (1940) Telegraph inventor
Jelly Roll Morton (originally Ferdinand J. La Menthe) (1995) Jazz musician and composer
Julius Sterling Morton (1932) Arbor Day founder
Anna Mary Robertson Moses "Grandma Moses" (1969) Painter

Robert Motherwell (2010) Abstract expressionist artist
Lucretia Mott (1948) Civil Rights advocate

John Muir (1964) Conservationist
Peter Müller-Munk (2011) Industrial designer
Luis Muñoz Marín (1980) First democratically elected governor of Puerto Rico
Audie L. Murphy (2000) World War II soldier, actor
Gerald Murphy (2013) Modern artist
Robert Daniel Murphy (2006) Diplomat

N 
Bronko Nagurski (2003) Football player

James Naismith (1961) Basketball inventor
Ogden Nash (2002) Poet
Harriet Nelson (2009) Actress
Ozzie Nelson (2009) Actor
Thomas Nelson, Jr. (1976) Declaration of Independence signatory
Louise Nevelson (2000) Sculptor
Ernie Nevers (2003) Football player

Ethelbert Nevin (1940) Composer
Alfred Newman (1999) Composer
Barnett Newman (2010) Abstract expressionist artist
Paul Newman (2015) Actor
Isamu Noguchi (2004) Sculptor
Eliot Noyes (2011) Industrial designer

O 

Adolph S. Ochs (1976) New York Times publisher
Severo Ochoa (2011) Biochemist
Flannery O'Connor (2015) Writer
William Butler Ogden (1944) Railroad tycoon, first Mayor of Chicago
James Edward Oglethorpe (1933) Georgia founder
Georgia O'Keeffe (1996, 2013) Painter
Frederick Law Olmsted (1999) Landscape architect
Eugene O'Neill (1973) Playwright

Rose O'Neill (2001) Illustrator
Eugene Ormandy (1997) Conductor
Timothy O'Sullivan (2002) Photographer
Mel Ott (2006) Baseball player
Mary White Ovington (2009) Civil rights leader
Jesse Owens (1990) Track & field athlete

P 
Ignacy Jan Paderewski (1960) Polish Prime Minister
Satchel Paige (2000) Baseball player

Thomas Paine (1965) Journalist
George Papanicolaou (1978) Cytologist
Al Parker (2001) Illustrator
Charlie Parker (1995) Jazz musician and composer

Rosa Parks (2013) Civil rights activist
Maxfield Parrish (2001) Illustrator

Alden Partridge (1985) Educator
George S. Patton, Jr. (1953) World War II Army General
Alice Paul (1995) Suffragist and feminist
Linus Pauling (2008) Chemist
Ethel L. Payne (2002) Journalist
Robert Edwin Peary (1959) Arctic explorer
Gregory Peck, (2011) Actor
Claude Pepper (2000) Senator

Frances Perkins (1980) Secretary of Labor
Matthew Perry (1953) Navy Commodore
Coles Phillips (2001) Illustrator
Édith Piaf (2012) Singer
Sylvia Plath (2012) Poet
Pocahontas (1907) Algonquian princess
Edgar Allan Poe (1949) Author
George Polk (2008) Journalist
James K. Polk (1938) 11th president
Jackson Pollock (1999) Painter
Lily Pons (1997) Soprano
Rosa Ponselle (1997) Soprano
Salem Poor (1975) Revolutionary War soldier
David D. Porter (1937) Civil War naval officer
Katherine Anne Porter (2006) Author
Emily Post (1998) Author
Albert Préjean (2008) Actor
Elvis Presley (1993, 2015) Rock and roll singer and musician
Tito Puente (2011) Drummer

Kazimierz Pułaski (1931) Revolutionary War soldier (spelled Casimir Pulaski on the stamp)
Lewis B. "Chesty" Puller (2005) Marine Corps General
Rufus Putnam (1937) Northwest Territory settler
Ernest Taylor Pyle (1971) Journalist

Howard Pyle (1964) Illustrator

Q 
Harriet Quimby (1991) Pilot and aviation pioneer

R 
Ayn Rand (1999) Author
Asa Philip Randolph (1989) Labor & Civil Rights advocate
Raphael (1973) Painter
Marjorie Kinnan Rawlings (2008) Author
Man Ray (2002, 2013) Photographer
Sam Rayburn (1962) Legislator

George Read (1976), lawyer and signer of the Declaration of Independence.
Ronald Reagan (2005, 2011) 40th president
Walter Reed (1940) Army surgeon
Frederic Remington (1940) Sculptor, painter
James Renwick, Jr. (1980) Architect
Ernst Reuter (1959) Berlin Mayor

Frederick Hurten Rhead (2011) Industrial designer
Gilbert Rohde (2011) Industrial designer

Paul Robeson (2004) Actor, singer, civil Rights advocate
Edward G. Robinson (2000) Actor
Jackie Robinson (1982) Baseball player

Sugar Ray Robinson (2006) Boxer
Norman Rockwell (1972) Painter
Jimmie Rodgers (1978) Country singer, musician, and songwriter
Theodore Roethke (2012) Poet
Fred Rogers (2018) Television personality and producer
Roy Rogers (2010) Singer, Actor
Felipe Rojas-Lombardi (2014) Chef, cookbook author

Eleanor Roosevelt (1963) First Lady
Franklin Delano Roosevelt (1945) 32nd president
Theodore Roosevelt (1922, 1938) 26th president
Mark Rothko (1998) Painter

Andrew J. Russell (1944) Photographer
George Herman "Babe" Ruth (1983) Baseball player

S 
Albert Sabin (2006) Virologist
Rubén Salazar (2008) Journalist
Jonas Salk (2006) Medical scientist
Haym Salomon (1975) Revolutionary War financier

William T. Sampson (1937) Navy Admiral
José de San Martín (1959) South American liberator
Sassoferrato (2009) Painer
Arturo Alfonso Schomburg (2020) historian and writer
Carl Schurz (1983) Journalist
Selena (2011) Singer
David O. Selznick (2003) Motion picture producer
Rod Serling (2009) Writer
Eric Sevareid (2008) Journalist

William Shakespeare (1964) Playwright
Charles Sheeler (1998, 2013) Painter
Alan Shepard (2011) Astronaut
Philip Henry Sheridan (1937) Civil War General

Roger Sherman (1976) Declaration of Independence signatory
William Tecumseh Sherman (1893) Civil War General
Dinah Shore (2009) Singer
Igor Sikorsky (1988) Aircraft engineer
Phil Silvers (2009) Comedian
William S. Sims (2010) Admiral
Frank Sinatra (2008) Singer/actor
George Sisler (2000) Baseball player
Sitting Bull (1989) Hunkpapa Sioux warrior
Red Skelton (2009) Comedian

John French Sloan (1971) Painter
Jessie Willcox Smith (2001) Illustrator
Kate Smith (2010) Singer
Margaret Chase Smith (2007) U.S. senator
W. Eugene Smith (2002) Photographer
Albert Southworth (2002) Photographer

Tris Speaker (2000) Baseball player
Anne Spencer (2020) Poet
Lawrence Sperry (1985) Aviation pioneer
Joel Elias Spingarn (2009) Civil rights leader
Leland Stanford (1944) Railroad tycoon, politician, & philanthropist
Edwin M. Stanton (1871) Secretary of War
Elizabeth Cady Stanton (1948) Suffragist, feminist, and abolitionist
Willie Stargell (2012) Baseball player
Vilhjalmur Stefansson (1986) Arctic explorer
Edward Steichen (2002) Photographer
Joseph Stella (2013) Modern artist

Friedrich Wilhelm von Steuben (1930) Revolutionary War general
Wallace Stevens (2012) Poet
Adlai Stevenson (1965) UN Ambassador and presidential candidate
James Stewart (2007) Actor
Alfred Stieglitz (2002) Photographer
Clyfford Still (2010) Abstract expressionist artist
Joseph W. Stilwell (2000) Army General
Richard Stockton (1976) Declaration of Independence signer
Leopold Stokowski (1997) Conductor
Harlan Fiske Stone (1948) Chief Justice

Lucy Stone (1965) Suffragist and feminist
Joseph Story (2009) Supreme Court justice
Harriet Beecher Stowe (2007) Author
Paul Strand (2002) Photographer
Ed Sullivan (2009) TV variety show host
George Szell (1997) Conductor, composer

T 

Robert A. Taft (1960) Senator
William Howard Taft (1930) 27th president, 10th Chief Justice of the United States
William Talman (2009) Actor
Henry Ossawa Tanner (1973) Painter

Ida Tarbell (2002) Author, journalist
Zachary Taylor (1875) 12th president
Walter Dorwin Teague (2011) Industrial designer
Shirley Temple (2016) Actress and diplomat
Mother Teresa (2010) Humanitarian
Mary Church Terrell (2009) Civil rights leader

Danny Thomas (2012) Entertainer
Charles Thomson (1976) Continental Congress Secretary
Henry David Thoreau (1967) Author
Jim Thorpe (1984) Football player
Lawrence Tibbett (1997) Opera singer
Giambattista Tiepolo (1982) Painter
Lewis Comfort Tiffany (2007) Designer
Pie Traynor (2000) Baseball player
William B. T. Trego (1976) Painter
Edward Trudeau (2008) Phthisiologist
Harry S. Truman (1973) 33rd president
Richard Tucker (1997) Tenor
Mark Twain (1940) Author

V 
James Van Der Zee (2002) Photographer
Vivian Vance (2009) Actress
Félix Varela (1997) Social reformer
Sarah Vaughan (2016) Jazz singer
Alfred V. Verville (1985) Aviation pioneer
King Vidor (2008) Film director, producer and screenwriter
Oswald Garrison Villard (2009) Civil rights leader
Greta von Nessen (2011) Industrial designer
John von Neumann (2005) Mathematician

W 
Honus Wagner (2000) Baseball player
Madam C.J. Walker (1998) Philanthropist

DeWitt Wallace (1998) Publisher
Lila Wallace (1998) Publisher
Raoul Wallenberg (1997) Humanitarian
Andy Warhol (2002) Painter

"Pop" Warner (1997) Football coach
Robert Penn Warren (2005) Author and poet

Booker T. Washington (1940) Educator
Fredi Washington (2008) Actress

George Washington (1847) 1st president
John P. Washington (1948) Chaplain (1st Lt.), U.S. Army
Martha Washington (1902) First Lady
Carleton Watkins (2002) Photographer
John Wayne (1990) Actor
Jack Webb (2009) Actor

Orson Welles (1999) Actor/film director

Joseph West (1930) Charleston Governor
Edward Weston (2002) Photographer
Clifton R. Wharton, Sr. (2006) Diplomat
Jon Whitcomb (2001) Illustrator
Josh White (1998) Folk singer, musician, songwriter, and actor
Minor White (2002) Photographer
Walter Francis White (2009) Civil rights leader
Billy Wilder (2012) Motion picture director
Thornton Wilder (1997) Playwright
Roy Wilkins (2001) Civil Rights advocate
Frances E. Willard (1940) Educator
Hank Williams (1993) Country singer, musician, and songwriter
Roger Williams (1936) Rhode Island co-founder
Ted Williams (2012) Baseball player
Tennessee Williams (1995) Playwright
William Williams (Continental Congress) (1976) Declaration of Independence signer
William Carlos Williams (2012) Poet
William Haliday Williams (1912) Rural mail carrier and Civil War Medal of Honor recipient
Thomas Willing (1976) Continental Congressman
Frances E. Willis (2006) Diplomat
Wendell Willkie (1992) Statesman
Bob Wills (1993) Country musician and songwriter
Meredith Willson (1999) Composer, playwright
August Wilson (2021) Playwright
James Wilson (1976) Declaration of Independence signer
Woodrow Wilson (1925) 28th president
Garry Winogrand (2002) Photographer
John Witherspoon (1976) Declaration of Independence signatory
Oliver Wolcott (1976) Declaration of Independence signer
Thomas Wolfe (2000) Author
Frank Lloyd Wright (1965) Architect
Richard Wright (2009) Writer
Russel Wright (2011) Industrial designer
Chien-Shiung Wu (2021) Physicist who proved that the basic law of parity was violated in physics that paved the way for the Standard Model
Newell Convers Wyeth (2001) Illustrator

X 
Malcolm X (1999) Civil rights advocate

Y 

Sun Yat-sen (1942, 1961) Chinese revolutionary leader
Alvin C. York (2000) World War I soldier, Medal of Honor recipient
Ashley Young (2000) Child stamp design contest winner
Cy Young (2000) Baseball player
Whitney Moore Young (1981) Civil Rights advocate

Z 
Babe Zaharias (1981) Track & field athlete

See also
Presidents of the United States on U.S. postage stamps
List of United States airmail stamps
Artists of stamps of the United States
Postage stamps and postal history of the United States
Postage stamps and postal history of the Confederate States

References 
 
 

United States
Postage stamps of the United States
Stamps